Kashtanova is a station on the Livoberezhna Line of the Kyiv Light Rail system. It was opened on May 26, 2000 and reopened after a significant modernization of the line on October 26, 2012.

Kashtanova is located in between the Teodora Draizera and Romana Shukhevycha stations.

At one point the Kyiv City authorities proposed creating the "Vulytsia Kashtanova" station of the Kyiv Metro's Livoberezhna Line, although that entire project was scrapped in favor of expanding the existing light rail system.

References

External links
 
 

Kyiv Light Rail stations
Railway stations opened in 2000
2000 establishments in Ukraine